Lucian Buzan (born 9 March 1999) is a Romanian professional footballer who plays as a midfielder for CSC 1599 Șelimbăr.

References

External links
 
 

1999 births
Living people
People from Caransebeș
Romanian footballers
Association football midfielders
FC Astra Giurgiu players
Liga I players
CS Universitatea Craiova players
FC Dunărea Călărași players
Liga II players
ACS Poli Timișoara players
FC Hermannstadt players
CSC 1599 Șelimbăr players